This is a list of earthquakes in Egypt, including earthquakes that either had their epicenter in Egypt, or caused significant damage in Egypt.

Seismic hazard

Seismic hazard in Egypt is highest at the southern end of the Gulf of Suez, the northern Red Sea and around the Gulf of Aqaba, the location of the active plate boundaries. The highest risk is the southern end of the Dead Sea Transform.

Notable earthquakes

See also 
 Geology of Egypt

References

Further reading
 

 
Earthquakes
Egypt